Clarence is an unincorporated community in Ford County, Illinois, United States. Clarence is within the limits of the remote Button Township and makes up most of its population. The community is located adjacent to Illinois Route 9, which provides service to nearby Paxton and Rankin.

References

Unincorporated communities in Illinois
Unincorporated communities in Ford County, Illinois